The Toleman TG181 is a Formula One car that was used in the 1981 Formula One season. It was also the first car used by Toleman in F1.

It was a generally poor car, with its drivers, Derek Warwick and Brian Henton, only getting through qualifying once each, with Henton's tenth place at Monza the only finish for the car. Due to its bulk, it became nicknamed the "General Belgrano" after the Argentine battleship sunk during the 1982 Falklands War.

Evolutions of the car, the Toleman TG181B and Toleman TG181C, were used the following year, to better effect.

It was sponsored by its later owner Benetton.

Complete Formula One results

(key) (results in italics indicate fastest lap)

All chassis powered by versions of the Hart '415T' 1.5-litre turbocharged 4-cylinder engine.

References

Toleman Formula One cars